Jack Ridley Harper (born October 8, 1944) is an American former college and professional football player who was a running back in the American Football League (AFL) and National Football League (NFL) for two seasons during the 1960s.  Harper played college football for the University of Florida, and thereafter, he played professionally for the Miami Dolphins of the AFL and NFL.

Early years 

Harper was born in Lakeland, Florida in 1944.  He attended Lakeland High School, and he played for the Lakeland Dreadnaughts high school football team.

College career 

Harper accepted an athletic scholarship to attend the University of Florida in Gainesville, Florida, where he played for coach Ray Graves' Florida Gators football team from 1963 to 1965.  Memorably, he had an 80-yard punt return for a touchdown versus the SMU Mustangs in 1964, and had 111 receiving yards against the Florida State Seminoles in 1965.  Harper led the Gators in kick return yardage for three consecutive seasons, and as a senior halfback in 1965, he became one of quarterback Steve Spurrier's favorite passing targets out of the backfield.  He had 1,127 total yards gained in 1965, including 286 rushing, 403 receiving and 438 kick return yards.

Professional career 

In July 1966, Harper was one of 83 rookies to show up at the original Miami Dolphins training camp held on St. Petersburg Beach. Harper suffered a slight back injury on the second day of practice, and he was cut on July 9, 1966, before the free agent veterans showed up, as the original group of 83 rookies had to be cut to 49 that day to make room for the incoming veterans. He compiled 197 rushing yards and a touchdown on forty-one carries, and 212 receiving yards and three touchdowns on eleven catches in his two AFL seasons.

See also 

 History of the Miami Dolphins
 List of American Football League players
 List of Miami Dolphins players

References

Bibliography 

 Carlson, Norm, University of Florida Football Vault: The History of the Florida Gators, Whitman Publishing, LLC, Atlanta, Georgia (2007).  .
 Golenbock, Peter, Go Gators!  An Oral History of Florida's Pursuit of Gridiron Glory, Legends Publishing, LLC, St. Petersburg, Florida (2002).  .
 Hairston, Jack, Tales from the Gator Swamp: A Collection of the Greatest Gator Stories Ever Told, Sports Publishing, LLC, Champaign, Illinois (2002).  .
 McCarthy, Kevin M.,  Fightin' Gators: A History of University of Florida Football, Arcadia Publishing, Mount Pleasant, South Carolina (2000).  .
 McEwen, Tom, The Gators: A Story of Florida Football, The Strode Publishers, Huntsville, Alabama (1974).  .
 Nash, Noel, ed., The Gainesville Sun Presents The Greatest Moments in Florida Gators Football, Sports Publishing, Inc., Champaign, Illinois (1998).  .

1944 births
Living people
American football running backs
Florida Gators football players
Miami Dolphins players
Players of American football from Florida
Sportspeople from Lakeland, Florida
American Football League players